Yauko is a former Maidu settlement in Butte County, California.

References
 

Former settlements in Butte County, California
Former Native American populated places in California
Lost Native American populated places in the United States
Maidu villages